The 2018–19 BTravel WABA League was the 18th season of the Adriatic League. Competition included eight teams from six countries. In this season participating clubs from Serbia, Croatia, Montenegro, Bosnia and Herzegovina, Bulgaria and Slovenia.

Teams

Team allocation

Venues and locations

Regular season

In the Regular season was played with 8 teams and play a dual circuit system, each with each one game at home and away. The four best teams at the end of the regular season were placed in the Final Four. The regular season began on 3 October 2018 and it will end on 6 March 2019.

Standings

Final Four

Final Four to be played from 23–24 March 2019 in the Celje, Slovenia.

Awards
Final Four MVP: Snežana Aleksić (173-G-89) of Beroe
Player of the Year: Ana Poček (190-C-93) of Beroe
Guard of the Year: Nikolina Babić (177-G-95) of Budućnost Bemax
Forward of Year: Larisa Ocvirk (187-SF-97) of Cinkarna Celje
Center of the Year: Ana Poček (190-C-93) of Beroe
Newcomer of the Year: Nikolina Zubac (188-C-98) of RMU Banovići
Most Improved Player of Year: Nikolina Babić (177-G-95) of Budućnost Bemax
Defensive Player of Year: Larisa Ocvirk (187-SF-97) of Cinkarna Celje
Coach of the Year: Tatyana Gateva of Beroe

1st Team
PG: Nikolina Babić (177-G-95) of Budućnost Bemax
SG: Friškovec (179-G-99) of Cinkarna Celje
F: Larisa Ocvirk (187-SF-97) of Cinkarna Celje
FC: Ana Poček (190-C-93) of Beroe
C: Nikolina Džebo (186-F/C-95) of Budućnost Bemax

2nd Team
PG: Nika Mühl (178-PG-01) of Trešnjevka 2009
SG: Rebeka Abramovič (172-PG-93) of Triglav Kranj
F: Hristina Ivanova (183-F-89) of Montana 2003
FC: Mina Đorđević (186-PF-99) of Crvena zvezda
C: Breanna Lewis (196-C-94) of Beroe

Honorable Mention
Chatrice White (190-C-96) of Cinkarna Celje
Snežana Bogićević (177-SG-97) of Crvena zvezda
Taylor Manuel (190-C-93) of Montana 2003

All-Defensive Team
PG: Nikolina Babić (177-G-95) of Budućnost Bemax
SG: Rebeka Abramovič (172-PG-93) of Triglav Kranj
F: Larisa Ocvirk (187-SF-97) of Cinkarna Celje
FC: Mina Đorđević (186-PF-99) of Crvena zvezda
C: Breanna Lewis (196-C-94) of Beroe

All-Newcomers Team
G: Ajda Burgar (176-SG-01) of Triglav Kranj
G: Dragana Zivković (184-G-01) of Budućnost Bemax
F: Gala Kramžar (163-PG-99) of Triglav Kranj
C: Nikolina Zubac (188-C-98) of RMU Banovići
C: Marta Vulović (198-C-00) of Crvena zvezda

See also 
 2018–19 ABA League First Division
 2018–19 Women's Basketball League of Serbia

References

External links
 Official website
 Profile at eurobasket.com

 
2018–19
2018–19 in European women's basketball leagues
2018–19 in Serbian basketball
2018–19 in Bosnia and Herzegovina basketball
2018–19 in Croatian basketball
2018–19 in Montenegrin basketball
2018–19 in Slovenian basketball
2018–19 in Bulgarian basketball